Clube Desportivo Feirense, commonly known as CD Feirense or just Feirense, is a Portuguese football club based in Santa Maria da Feira. Founded on 18 March 1918, Feirense play in the LigaPro, the second tier of Portuguese football. Their chairman is Kunle Soname and their manager is Filipe Martins. The club plays its home matches at the Estádio Marcolino de Castro, with a capacity of 5,500 spectators.

History
Founded in 1918, Feirense played only three Primeira Liga seasons in the 20th century – 1962–63, 1977–78 and 1989–90 – being relegated in each one. In 2009–10, the club came close to ending a two-decade exile but missed out on the last day, as local rivals S.C. Beira-Mar went up with Portimonense SC.

The following year, Feirense went one better by coming second, missing out on the title on goal difference to Gil Vicente F.C. and winning promotion under Quim Machado in May 2011. However, a year later they were relegated. A four-season spell in the second tier ended with promotion in third place in May 2016, under manager José Mota.

Mota left in December 2016 and was succeeded by his assistant Nuno Manta Santos, who took the team to a best-ever eighth place. After just staying up in 2018, Feirense went down in April 2019 with four games to play.

Stadium
The Estádio Marcolino de Castro is a multi-use stadium in the town of Santa Maria da Feira. It is currently used mostly for football matches and is the home stadium of Feirense, who play in the Portuguese Liga. The stadium is capable of holding other sporting events. Its capacity for a football match is 5,500 spectators. Estádio Marcolino de Castro was built in 1962 when Feirense was promoted for the very first time to the top-flight Portuguese Liga.

Players

Current squad

Out on loan

Managerial history

 Alfredo Valadas (1959–60)
 Henrique Nunes (1987–90)
 Álvaro Carolino (1991)
 Henrique Nunes (1991–93)
 Amândio Barreiras (1993–95)
 Henrique Nunes (1995–97)
 António Jesus (1997)
 José Dinis (1997–98)
 Henrique Nunes (1998–99)
 Chiquinho Carioca (2000)
 Gabriel Mendes (2000)
 Edmundo Duarte (2000–01)
 António Caetano (2000–01)
 Henrique Nunes (2001–03)
 Francisco Chaló (2003–06)
 Henrique Nunes (2006–07)
 Luís Miguel (2007–08)
 Álvaro Magalhães (2008)
 Henrique Nunes (2008)
 Francisco Chaló (2008–09)
 Carlos Garcia (2009–10)
 Quim Machado (2010–12)
 Henrique Nunes (2012)
 Bruno Moura (2012)
 Quim Machado (2012–13)
 Pedro Miguel (2013–15)
 Pepa (2015–16)
 José Mota (2016)
 Nuno Manta Santos (2016–19)
 Filipe Martins (2019)
 Filó (2019–)

Honours
Segunda Liga
Runners-up (1): 2010–11
 Portuguese Second Division
Winners (1): 2002–03
Runners-up (3): 1961–62, 1976–77, 1993–94
 AF Aveiro First Division
Winners (3):  1959–60, 1965–66, 1967–68

References

External links
 CD Feirense Official Site
 ZeroZero Profile & Squad
 ForaDeJogo Profile & Squad

 
Football clubs in Portugal
Association football clubs established in 1918
1918 establishments in Portugal
Primeira Liga clubs
Liga Portugal 2 clubs